Alabama Moon  is a 2009 American coming-of-age film directed by Tim McCanlies and starring Jimmy Bennett and John Goodman, based on the book Alabama Moon by Watt Key. The story takes place in the forests of Alabama.

Cast
Jimmy Bennett as Moon Blake
John Goodman as Mr. Wellington
Uriah Shelton as Kit
Gabriel Basso as Hal Mitchell
Clint Howard as Constable Davy Sanders
J. D. Evermore as Oliver Blake
Elizabeth Jackson as Rachael Gene
Michael P. Sullivan as Mr. Gene
Walter Breaux as Mr. Carter
Gary Grubbs as Judge Mackin
John McConnell as Mr. Mitchell
Peter Gabb as Mr. Albroscotto
Mark Adam Miller as Mike Blake
Colin Ford as Moon Blake (voice narrator)

Accolades
The film was awarded the Dove Foundation Family Approved seal in 2010.

References

External links

2000s coming-of-age drama films
2009 films
American coming-of-age drama films
Films directed by Tim McCanlies
Films set in Alabama
Films set in the 1980s
2009 drama films
2000s English-language films
2000s American films